The Filmfare Award for Best Female Playback – Kannada is given by the Filmfare magazine as part of its annual Filmfare Awards South for Kannada films. The first Kannada award was given in 2007. Before that, since 1997 till 2005, a common award for playback was available for both Male and Female singers of all the four South Indian languages.

Superlatives
as of 2020-21

Winners
The following is a list of the award winners and the films for which they won.

Nominations
The nominees were announced publicly only from 2009. The list along with winners:

2000s
2009: Shreya Ghoshal – "Ninna Nodalenthu" – Mussanjemaatu
 K. S. Chithra – "Nadheem Dheem Tana" – Gaalipata
 Shreya Ghoshal – "Moggina Manasali" – Moggina Manasu
 Shreya Ghoshal – "Aakasha Bhoomi" – Mussanjemaatu
 Sunidhi Chauhan – "Rock Me Baby" – Haage Summane

2010s
2010: Shamitha Malnad – "Madhura Pisu Maathige" – Birugaali
 Nanditha – "Neenendare" – Raam
 Sadhana Sargam – "Marali Mareyagi" – Savaari
 Shreya Ghoshal – "Hoovina Banadante" – Birugaali
 Shreya Ghoshal – "Yenu Helabeku" – Maleyali Jotheyali

2011: Sunitha Upadrashta – "O Priyathama" – Cheluveye Ninne Nodalu
 Neha Kakkar – "Horage Haradide Thamassu" – Thamassu
 Sadhana Sargam – Marali Mareyagi – Savaari
 Shreya Ghoshal – "Ello" – Just Math Mathalli
 Shreya Ghoshal – "Eradu Jadeyannu" – Jackie
 Sunitha Goparaju – "Prathama" – Modalasala

2012: Shreya Ghoshal – "Gaganave Baagi" – Sanju Weds Geetha
 Lakshmi Manmohan – "Parijathada" – Krishnan Marriage Story
 Shamitha Malnad – "Neerige Baare Chenni" – Jarasandha
 Shamita Malnad – "Manase Manase" – Saarathi
 Shreya Ghoshal – "Maayavi Maayavi" – Lifeu Ishtene

2013: Indu Nagaraj – "Pyarge Aagbittaite" – Govindaya Namaha
 Anuradha Bhat – "Ellello Oduva Manase"  – Sidlingu
 Shreya Ghoshal – "Yenendhu Hesaridali" – Anna Bond
 Shreya Ghoshal – "Aalochane" – Romeo
 Vani Harikrishna – "Mussanje Veleli" – Addhuri

2014: Sowmya Raoh – "Karagida Baaninalli" – Simple Agi Ondh Love Story
 Anuradha Bhat – "Sri Krishna" – Bhajarangi
 Manjula Gururaj – "Aakal Benne" – Shravani Subramanya
 Sachina Heggar – "Hedarabyadri" – Kaddipudi
 Shreya Ghoshal – "Modala Maleyante" – Myna

2015: Anuradha Bhat – "Chanchana Chanchana"  – Ugramm
 Archana Ravi – "Kannalle Kannige" – Adyaksha
 Malathi – "Pantara Panta" – Maanikya
 Shreya Ghoshal – "Kaakig Banna Kantha" – Ulidavaru Kandanthe
 Sinchana Dixit – "Currentu Hoda Timealli" – Love in Mandya

2016: Inchara Rao – "Kareyole" – RangiTaranga
  Anuradha Bhat – "Irali Heege" – Benkipatna
 Indu Nagaraj – "Ka Thalkattu Kaa" – Mr. Airavata
 Shreya Ghoshal – "Shuru Shuru" – 1st Rank Raju
 Vani Harikrishna – "Raata Patta" – Rhaatee

2017: Ananya Bhat – "Namma Kayo Devare" – Rama Rama Re...
 Anuradha Bhat – "Yavoora Geleya" – Ricky
 Indu Nagaraj – "Thraas Akkathi" – Doddmane Hudga
 Shreya Ghoshal – "Neenire Saniha" – Kirik Party
 Vani Harikrishna – "Neenaagi Helalilla" – Happy Birthday

2018: Anuradha Bhat – "Appa I Love You" from Chowka
 Eesha Suchi – "Preethi Maruva Santheyalli" from Beautiful Manasugalu
 Indu Nagaraj – "Sanje Hotthu" from Tarak
 R. K. Sparsha – "O Manase" from Kempirve
 Supriya Lohith – "Nee Nanna Olavu" from Chamak

2019: Bindhu Malini – "Bhavalokada Bhrameya" from Nathicharami
Aditi Sagar – "Dum Maro Dum" from Raambo 2
Ananya Bhat – "Hold On Hold On" from  Tagaru
Anuradha Bhat – "Holeva Holeyachage"  from Ammachi Yemba Nenapu
Bindhu Malini – "Bhavalokada" from Nathicharami
Madhuri Sheshadri – "Nooraru Bannagalu" from Sarkari Hi. Pra. Shaale, Kasaragodu, Koduge: Ramanna Rai

2020s
2020-21: Anuradha Bhat –  "Dheera Sammohagaara" from Bicchugatti
 Aishwarya Rangarajan – "Malaye Malaye" from Salaga
 Chinmayi Sripaada – "Soul of Dia" from Dia
 Shreya Ghoshal – "Kannu Hodiyaka" from Roberrt
 Shruthi VS – "Love you Chinna" from Love Mocktail
 Shwetha Devanahally – "Tareefu Maadalu" from Mugilpete

See also

 List of music awards honoring women
 Filmfare Award for Best Male Playback Singer – Kannada

External links

Female Playback Singer
Music awards honoring women